The following roads are called the Roosevelt Expressway:
Roosevelt Expressway (Jacksonville) in Jacksonville, Florida
Roosevelt Expressway, part of the Roosevelt Boulevard in Philadelphia, Pennsylvania
Theodore Roosevelt Expressway in North Dakota, South Dakota, and Montana
FDR Drive in New York City, an expressway named after Franklin D. Roosevelt